The Strictly-Correlated-Electrons (SCE) density functional theory (SCE DFT) approach, originally proposed by Michael Seidl, is a formulation 
of density functional theory, alternative to the widely used Kohn-Sham DFT, especially aimed at the study of 
strongly-correlated systems. The essential difference between the two approaches is the choice of the auxiliary system (having the same density  
as the real, physical one). In Kohn-Sham DFT this system is composed by non-interacting electrons, for which the kinetic energy can be calculated 
exactly and the interaction term has to be approximated. In SCE DFT, instead, the starting point is totally the opposite one: the auxiliary system has infinite electronic 
correlation and zero kinetic energy.

The Strictly-Correlated-Electron reference system

To understand how the SCE system is constructed, it is useful to first think in terms of a simple example. Consider a collection of  identical classical charges 
(with repulsive Coulomb interaction) confined in some container with a given shape. If let alone, the charges will distribute themselves within the container until they reach 
the spatial configuration that minimizes their interaction energy (in equilibrium, their kinetic energy is zero). Of course, the equilibrium position of the charges will 
depend on the shape of the container.

Suppose now that in this classical system one of the  charges, which we can label as number “1”, is pinned at some arbitrary position  
inside the container. Clearly, the equilibrium position of the other  charges will now not only depend on the shape of the container, but also on the position 
 of the pinned charge. Thus, for a given confining geometry, one can write the position of the -th particle , 
, as a function of : .

In the SCE system, as in the classical example described above, the position  of a reference electron determines the position of the remaining 
ones. The analogue role of the confining container is now played by the condition that the density at each point must be the same as that of the real system, 
: the electrons will always try to be as far apart from each other as possible, in order to minimize their repulsion, but always restricted 
by this condition. The positions  are called co-motion functions and play a fundamental role in the SCE formalism, analogue to 
the one of the Kohn-Sham single-particle orbitals in Kohn-Sham DFT.

Calculation of the co-motion functions and interaction energy of the SCE system

For a given density , the probability of finding one electron at a certain position  is the same as that of finding 

 .

The co-motion functions can be obtained from the integration of this equation. An analytical solution exists for 1D systems, but not for the general case.

The interaction energy of the SCE system for a given density  can be exactly calculated in terms of the co-motion functions as 

 .

Notice that this is analogous to the Kohn-Sham approach, where the non-interacting kinetic energy is expressed in terms of the Kohn-Sham single-particle orbitals.

A very important property of the SCE system is the following one: since the position of one particle determines the position of the remaining ones, the total 
coulomb repulsion felt by a particle at a point  becomes a function of only  itself. This force can then be written 
as minus the gradient of some one-particle potential :

 .

At the same time, it can be shown that the potential  satisfies the relation 

 .

A promising route towards the application of the SCE approach to systems with general symmetry is the mass-transportation-theory reformulation of the approach. This is 
based on the analogies between the SCE problem and the dual Kantorovich problem. The SCE wave function is also very useful
to set rigorous bounds for the constant appearing in the Lieb-Oxford inequality.

Combining the strictly-correlated-electron and the Kohn-Sham approaches

The one-body potential  can be used to approximate the Hartree-exchange-correlation (Hxc) potential of the Kohn-Sham DFT approach. 
the well-known one of Kohn-Sham DFT

 ,

which relates the Hartree-exchange-correlation (Hxc) functional and the corresponding potential.

The approximation (which becomes exact in the limit of infinitely strong interaction) corresponds to writing the Hohenberg-Kohn functional as

 ,

where  is the non-interacting kinetic energy.

One has therefore  and this leads to the Kohn-Sham equations

,

which can be solved self-consistently.

Since the  potential is constructed from the exact properties of the SCE system, it is able to capture the effects of the 
strongly-correlated regime, as it has been recently shown in the first applications of this "KS-SCE DFT" approach to simple model systems. In particular, the 
method has allowed to observe Wigner localization in strongly-correlated electronic systems without introducing any artificial symmetry breaking.

Other related density functional methods in the strongly correlated system
The fractional quantum Hall effect(FQHE) is a strongly correlated system of general interest in the field of condensed matter. Previous DFT applications maps the FQHE to a reference system of non-interacting electrons, but fail to capture many interesting features of FQHE. The progress has been recently made to map the FQHE instead to a reference system of non-interacting composite fermions, which are emergent particles in FQHE. When a non-local exchange-correlation is incorporated to take care of the long-range gauge interaction between composite fermions, this DFT method successfully captures not only configurations with nonuniform densities but also topological properties
such as fractional charge and fractional braid statistics for the quasiparticles excitations. This is a non-trivial example of how the DFT method can be applied to a strongly correlated FQHE system and provide numerical result comparable to those exact-diagonalization results. It opens a new line to attack the problem of FQHE through the popular DFT method.

References

Density functional theory